Vista Alegre is an administrative neighborhood (barrio) of Madrid belonging to the district of Carabanchel. As of 1 February 2020, it as a population of 47,757. The Palacio Vistalegre, a multipurpose arena, is located in the neighborhood.

References 

Wards of Madrid
Carabanchel